The 2012 Open de Rennes was a professional tennis tournament played on hard courts. It was the seventh edition of the tournament which was part of the 2012 ATP Challenger Tour. It took place in Rennes, France between 8 and 14 October 2012.

Singles main-draw entrants

Seeds

 1 Rankings are as of October 1, 2012.

Other entrants
The following players received wildcards into the singles main draw:
  Grégoire Burquier
  Marc Gicquel
  Julien Obry
  Maxime Teixeira

The following players received entry from the qualifying draw:
  Laurynas Grigelis
  Illya Marchenko
  Fabrice Martin
  Dominic Thiem

The following players received entry into the singles main draw as a lucky loser:
  Martin Fischer

Champions

Singles

 Kenny de Schepper def.  Illya Marchenko, 6–3, 6–2

Doubles

 Philipp Marx /  Florin Mergea def.  Tomasz Bednarek /  Mateusz Kowalczyk, 6–3, 6–2

External links
Official Website

Open de Rennes
Open de Rennes
2012 in French tennis